Exeliopsis is a genus of moths in the family Geometridae erected by Louis Beethoven Prout in 1938.

Species
Some species of this genus are:
Exeliopsis amygdala Prout L. B., 1938
Exeliopsis ansorgei (Warren, 1905) (Nigeria)
Exeliopsis brunnea Viette, 1977 (Madagascar)
Exeliopsis discipuncta Holloway, 1993 (Borneo)
Exeliopsis exelisia (Semper) (Philippines)
Exeliopsis hibernaria (Swinhoe 1886) (India, Indonesia) 
Exeliopsis insulanus Prout L. B., 1938 (Kenya)
Exeliopsis macrouncus Holloway, 1993 (Borneo, Sumatra, Thailand)
Exeliopsis perse (Fawcett, 1916) (Kenya)
Exeliopsis postfasciata Holloway, 1993 (Borneo, Sumatra)

References

Boarmiini